The Roman Catholic Diocese of Jabalpur is a diocese located in the city of Jabalpur in the ecclesiastical province of Bhopal in India.

History

 July 18, 1932: Established as the Apostolic Prefecture of Jubbulpore from the Diocese of Allahabad and Diocese of Nagpur
 October 21, 1950: Renamed as Apostolic Prefecture of Jabalpur
 July 5, 1954: Promoted as Diocese of Jabalpur

Leadership
 Bishops of Jabalpur (Latin Rite)
 Bishop Gerald Almeida (May 16, 2001 – present)
 Bishop Théophane Matthew Thannickunnel, O. Praem. (March 1, 1976 – May 16, 2001)
 Bishop Leobard D’Souza (later Archbishop) (December 17, 1965 – July 1, 1975)
 Bishop Conrad Dubbelman, O. Praem. (July 5, 1954 – December 17, 1965)
 Prefects Apostolic of Jabalpur (Roman Rite) 
 Fr. Conrad Dubbelman, O. Praem. (later Bishop) (May 29, 1933 – July 5, 1954)

Bishop Theophane O.Praem was the principal of St. Aloysius Senior Secondary School, Jabalpur.

References

External links
 GCatholic.org 
 Catholic Hierarchy 

Roman Catholic dioceses in India
Christianity in Madhya Pradesh
Christian organizations established in 1932
Roman Catholic dioceses and prelatures established in the 20th century
1932 establishments in India
Jabalpur